Events in 2020 in anime.

Releases

Films
A list of anime that debuted in theaters between January 1 and December 31, 2020.

Television series
A list of anime television series that debuted between January 1 and December 31, 2020.

Original net animations
A list of original net animations that debuted between January 1 and December 31, 2020.

Original video animations
A list of original video animations that debuted between January 1 and December 31, 2020.

Deaths

January
 January 9: Yūji Yamaguchi, Japanese animator (Fate/stay night), dies at age 58.

February
 February 13: Yoshisada Sakaguchi, Japanese voice actor (Philip II of Macedon in Reign, Muijika in Mushishi, Hachiroh Tohbe in Jin-Roh: The Wolf Brigade, Tonpetty in 2007 JoJo's Bizarre Adventure: Phantom Blood film), dies at age 80.
 February 21: Hisashi Katsuta, Japanese voice actor (Professor Ochanomizu in Astro Boy, Dr. Hoshi in Astroganger, Professor Tobishima in Groizer X, Shin'ichirō Izumi in Tōshō Daimos, dies at age 92.
 February 22: Kazuhiko Kishino, Japanese voice actor (voice of Mayumi Kinniku in Kinnikuman), dies at age 86.
February 29:  Luis Alfonso Mendoza, Mexican voice dub actor (Latin American voice dub of teenage and adult Gohan in Dragon Ball Z and Dragon Ball GT, Leonardo in Teenage Mutant Ninja Turtles), is murdered at age 55.

April 
 April 12: Keiji Fujiwara, Japanese voice actor (Maes Hughes in Fullmetal Alchemist, Ladd Russo in Baccano, Hiroshi Nohara in Crayon Shin-chan, Reno in Final Fantasy VII Remake, Leorio Paladiknight in Hunter x Hunter), dies of cancer at age 55.

November 

 November 4: Sergio Matteucci, Italian voice actor and radio presenter (Italian dub voice of Saiyan B in Dragon Ball Z, narrator in Dastardly and Muttley in Their Flying Machines), dies at age 89.

November 15: Hikari Yono, Japanese voice actress (Sailor Moon Crystal, Naruto: Shippuden), dies at age 46.
November 18: 
Kirby Morrow, Canadian voice actor, writer and comedian (voice of Cyclops from X-Men: Evolution, Jay from Class of the Titans, Hot Shot from Transformers: Cybertron, American dub voice of Miroku from InuYasha, Van Fanel from the Ocean dub of Escaflowne, Teru Mikami from Death Note, Trowa Barton from Mobile Suit Gundam Wing, Ryo Takatsuki from Project ARMS, Goku from Ocean's dub of Dragon Ball Z (from Episode 160 onwards), Cole from Lego Ninjago: Masters of Spinjitzu), dies at age 47.
Jonas Rodrigues de Mello, Brazilian actor (voice of Shadowseat in Cassiopeia, Montanha in The Happy Cricket and the Giant Bugs, Brazilian dub of various villains in Dragonball Z, Brazilian dub voice of Rataxes in The Adventures of Babar), dies at age 83.
November 30: Enrico Bertorelli, Italian actor and voice actor (Italian dub voice of Cell and Commander Red in Dragon Ball Z, Commissioner James Gordon in Batman: The Animated Series), dies at age 78.

See also
2020 in Japanese television
2020 in animation

References

External links 
Japanese animated works of the year, listed in the IMDb

Years in anime
anime
anime